The Catholic University of America (CUA) is a private Roman Catholic research university in Washington, D.C. It is a pontifical university of the Catholic Church in the United States and the only institution of higher education founded by U.S. Catholic bishops. Established in 1887 as a graduate and research center following approval by Pope Leo XIII, the university began offering undergraduate education in 1904. It is classified among "R2: Doctoral Universities – High research activity". 

Its campus is adjacent to the Brookland neighborhood, known as "Little Rome", which contains 60 Catholic institutions, including Trinity Washington University, the Dominican House of Studies, and Archbishop Carroll High School, as well as the Basilica of the National Shrine of the Immaculate Conception.

CUA's programs emphasize the liberal arts, professional education, and personal development. The school stays closely connected with the Catholic Church and Catholic organizations. The residential U.S. cardinals put on the American Cardinals Dinner each year to raise scholarship funds. The university also has a long history of working with the Knights of Columbus; its law school and basilica have dedications to the involvement and support of the Knights.

History

Founding

At the Second Plenary Council of Baltimore in 1866, the United States Conference of Catholic Bishops first discussed the need for a national Catholic university. At the Third Plenary Council on January 26, 1885, bishops chose the name The Catholic University of America for the institution.

In 1882, Bishop John Lancaster Spalding went to Rome to obtain Pope Leo XIII's support for the university, also persuading his family friend Mary Gwendoline Caldwell to pledge $300,000 to establish it. On April 10, 1887, pope Leo XIII sent James Cardinal Gibbons a letter granting permission to establish the university. On March 7, 1889, the Pope issued the encyclical Magni Nobis, granting the university its charter and establishing its mission as the instruction of Catholicism and human nature together at the graduate level. By developing new leaders and new knowledge, the university was intended to strengthen and enrich Catholicism in the United States.

President Grover Cleveland was in attendance for the laying of the cornerstone of Divinity Hall, now known as Caldwell Hall, on May 24, 1888, as were members of Congress and the U.S. Cabinet.

Growth

When the university first opened on November 13, 1889, the curriculum consisted of lectures in mental and moral philosophy, English literature, the sacred scriptures, and the various branches of theology. At the end of the second term, lectures on canon law were added. The first students were graduated in 1889. by 1900 CUA was one of the 14 colleges that offered doctorate programs which formed the Association of American Universities.

In 1904, the university added an undergraduate program. The president of the first undergraduate class was Frank Kuntz, whose memoir of that period was published by the Catholic University of America Press. The university gives an annual award named for Kuntz.

Bishop and Rector Thomas J. Shahan gave a speech to the Ancient Order of Hibernians in 1894 in which he advocated for Irish independence in language, culture, and politics. This resulted in the Hibernians endowing a chair of Gaelic Languages and Literature at the university. Only Harvard University had a similar position at the time, and this attracted the attention of William Butler Yeats. During a trip to the United States, Yeats spoke to students in McMahon Hall on February 21, 1904. In a follow-up letter to Shahan, he said: "you have surely a great university and I wish we had its like in Ireland."

Reconstruction and Civil Rights eras
Despite Washington being a Southern and segregated city when the university was founded, it admitted black Catholic men as students. At the time, the only other college in the District to do so was Howard University, founded for African-American education after the Civil War. In 1895, Catholic University had three black students, all from DC. "They were simply tested as to their previous education, and this being found satisfactory, no notice whatever was taken of their color. They stand on exactly the same footing as other students of equal intellectual calibre and acquirements", according to Keane. Conaty, speaking to President William McKinley during a visit on June 1, 1900, said that the university, "like the Catholic Church ... knows no race line and no color line."

This policy was reversed in 1914, with CUA kowtowing to segregationist policies and commencing denial of admissions to Black students.

Interwar period
In 1935, the university's coat of arms was designed by Pierre de Chaignon la Rose.

A victory parade for the 1936 Orange Bowl champions went up Pennsylvania Avenue on its circular route from Union Station to campus. President Franklin D. Roosevelt, "on his way to church, became an unwitting parader, when the march de triumph jammed traffic in front of the White House."

In 1938, due to the rise of the antisemitic priest Charles Coughlin and not long after Kristallnacht, CUA officials asked CBS and NBC to broadcast an event live from the university campus. The broadcast had little effect, participating clerics did not mention Coughlin, and barely mentioned Nazi conduct by name, while offering general support for Jews.

The university began admitting Black students again in 1936, following protests from Thomas Wyatt Turner, the Federated Colored Catholics and NAACP (both of which Turner co-founded), and the Catholic Interracial Council."By 1939, 40 Black students were enrolled at the University, 31 in the School of Arts and Sciences. However, discrimination persisted in extracurricular activities, dining halls, and dorms until the mid-1940s."

Law school
In 1954, Columbus University merged with the law program of CUA to become the Columbus School of Law at the Catholic University of America, after the American Bar Association in 1951 challenged law schools not affiliated with a university. The CUA law school was the first professional school of the university.

Recent history
The presence of CUA attracted other Catholic institutions to the area, including colleges, religious orders, and national service organizations. Between 1900 and 1940, more than 50 international Catholic institutions rented or owned property in neighboring Brookland. During the post-World War II years, Catholic University had a dramatic expansion in enrollment, thanks to veterans making use of the G.I. Bill to complete college educations. By the early 21st century, the university has over 6,000 students from all 50 states and around the world.

In 2018 the university experienced some challenges as administrators worked to reduce a $3.5 million deficit. Some faculty objected to the draft plan and voted "no confidence" in the president and provost.

On September 22, 2021, it was announced that John Garvey would be stepping down as President of Catholic University on June 30, 2022.

Knights of Columbus

The Knights of Columbus and The Catholic University of America have a history of "a close and supportive relationship" that dates almost to the founding of the university.

In 1899 the National Council of the K of C established a Knights of Columbus Chair of American History at the university. More than 10,000 Knights were on hand on April 13, 1904, to present a $55,633.79 check ($1,399,831.80 in 2012 dollars) to endow the chair.

In December 1904 Cardinal Gibbons appealed to the Knights for more financial aid to help meet operating costs after some investments went sour. The Order gave nearly $25,000. By 1907 the financial situation of Catholic University had improved but was still shaky. Every Knight was asked to contribute $1 a year for a five-year period, and in December 1913, a $500,000 endowment was established.

In 1920 the order contributed $60,000 toward the Catholic University gymnasium and drill hall, which later was adapted for use as the Crough Building housing the School of Architecture. In 2006, the Knights announced an $8,000,000 gift to the university to renovate Keane Hall and rename it as McGivney Hall, after the Knights' founder, Michael J. McGivney. The building, which was vacant, now houses the Washington session of the Pontifical John Paul II Institute for Studies on Marriage and Family, which was funded by the Knights and established at the Dominican House of Studies adjacent to the CUA campus in 1988.

A $1,000,000 trust was established in August 1965 to fund the Pro Deo and Pro Patria Scholarship, providing twelve undergraduate scholarships annually to the university. In 1989 the Knights voted a $2,000,000 birthday gift to the U.S. bishops on their bicentennial, to be given to Catholic University and used to fund special projects jointly chosen by the university and the Knights. Part of it was used to build the Columbus School of Law.

Papal visits
CUA is the only American university to have been visited by three popes and is one of only two universities to have any visits by a pontiff. Pope John Paul II visited on October 7, 1979. On April 16, 2008, Pope Benedict XVI gave an address at the campus about Catholic education and academic freedom. Pope Francis visited on September 23, 2015, during his trip to the United States, where he celebrated Mass on the east portico of the Basilica of the National Shrine of the Immaculate Conception.

Campus

The CUA campus is in the residential community of Brookland in Northeast Washington; its main entrance is 620 Michigan Ave., NE. The campus is bound by Michigan Avenue to the south, North Capitol Street to the west, Hawaii Avenue to the north, and John McCormick Road to the east. It is three miles (5 km) north of the Capitol building.

Romanesque and modern design dominate among the university's 48 major buildings. Between McMahon and Gibbons halls and alongside the Basilica of the National Shrine of the Immaculate Conception runs The Mall, a large strip of grass often used by Ultimate Frisbee players and sunbathers. Conte Circle is in the middle of Centennial Village, a cluster of eight residential houses.

The Edward J. Pryzbyla University Center opened in the spring of 2003, bringing student dining services, the campus bookstore, student organization offices, an 800-person ballroom, a convenience store, and more student services under one roof. The John K. Mullen Library completed a $6,000,000 renovation in 2004.

The Columbus School of Law is on the main campus and has a building with mock courtrooms, a library, chapel, classrooms, and offices.

Theological College, the United States' national Catholic seminary, is affiliated with CUA, sending students there for their studies. Also located near campus is the St. John Paul II Seminary, a minor seminary for the Archdiocese of Washington but also serving nearby dioceses and hosting seminarians from dioceses around the country. Students from the minor seminary study for their undergraduate philosophy degrees at the university. Several organizations of religious life also have seminaries nearby—including the Josephites, Carmelites, Franciscans, Oblates of Mary Immaculate, and Paulists—all of which send students to CUA.

In April 2004, CUA purchased  of land from the Armed Forces Retirement Home. It is the largest plot of open space in the District and makes CUA the largest university in D.C. by area. There are no plans for the parcel other than to secure it for future growth.

In 2007, CUA unveiled plans to expand its campus by adding three new dormitories to the north side of campus. The first of these, the seven-story Opus Hall, was completed in 2009 in the university's traditional Collegiate Gothic style. It houses 420 upper-class students and is Washington's first LEED-certified dormitory. Opus Hall is the first residential community to house both male and female students since the 2007 adoption of a single-sex dormitory policy.

CUA demolished Conaty and Spellman dormitories, which allowed for the development of Monroe Street by Bozzuto contracting. In partnership with the university, Monroe Street Market and the Brookland Arts Walk opened in 2014. A CUA Barnes & Noble bookstore opened on Monroe. New apartments in the development allow older students the opportunity to reside off campus within walking distance of the university.

The campus is served by the Brookland-CUA station on the Red Line of the Washington Metro. Near the campus are the offices of the United States Conference of Catholic Bishops and the Franciscan Monastery of the Holy Land in America.

Satellite campuses
In 2015 CUA began a partnership with the Australian Catholic University to effectively own and operate a second campus in Rome, Italy. It is housed in a former convent and includes a chapel. Before being sent home during the COVID-19 pandemic, 35 students were at the campus.

In 2020, a partnership with Pima Community College created a satellite campus in Tucson, Arizona. In 2021, a new site in Alexandria, Virginia, occupying 18,500 square feet on the second floor of Catholic Charities USA's headquarters building was opened to offer a number of noncredit certificate programs.

Green initiatives and sustainability
CUA has environmental sustainability programs, including participation in Earth Day, Casey Trees tree planting, and Campus Beautification Day. CUA's newest building, Opus Hall, is LEED-compliant, and the school buys 30% of its electricity from green sources. CUA participated in the 2010 College Sustainability Report Card rating.

In 2009, the School of Architecture and Planning introduced a Master of Science program in sustainable design.

Academics

Catholic University has 12 schools:
School of Architecture and Planning
School of Arts and Sciences
Tim and Steph Busch School of Business
School of Canon Law
School of Engineering
Columbus School of Law
Benjamin T. Rome School of Music, Drama, and Art
Conway School of Nursing
School of Philosophy
Metropolitan School of Professional Studies
National Catholic School of Social Service
School of Theology and Religious Studies
It also has 21 research centers and facilities as well as serving as home to the Catholic University of America Press, established in 1939. The 12 schools offer Doctor of Philosophy degrees (or appropriate professional degrees) in 66 programs and Master's Degrees in 103 programs. Undergraduate degrees are awarded in 72 programs by six schools: architecture and planning, arts and sciences, engineering, music, nursing, and philosophy.

Undergraduates combine a liberal arts curriculum in arts and sciences with courses in a major field of study. The Metropolitan School provides programs for adults who wish to earn baccalaureate degrees or participate in continuing education and certificate programs on a part-time basis. Catholic University is the only U.S. university with an ecclesiastical faculty of canon law (established by the Holy See in 1923) and is one of the few U.S. universities with ecclesiastical faculties of philosophy and sacred theology. Theological College, the university seminary, prepares men for the priesthood. The School of Theology and Religious Studies is a member of the Washington Theological Consortium.

The Catholic University of America announced on January 8, 2013, the creation of a School of Business and Economics. Previously housed in the School of Arts and Sciences as Department of Business and Economics, the university's board of trustees voted in December 2012 to confirm the creation of the school commencing January 1, 2013, after a three-year process of discernment, evaluation, and planning. In fall 2013, the School of Library and Information Science became a department of the School of Arts and Sciences, giving the university its present composition.

Ninety-eight percent of full-time faculty have doctoral or terminal degrees and 68% teach undergraduates. Of the full-time faculty, 59% are Catholic. In 2018, every tenured and tenure track professor of biology received funding from the National Institutes of Health, which is "quite rare in any university".

CUA was one of the fourteen founding members of the Association of American Universities, although it withdrew its membership in 2002, citing a conflict with its mission. In addition, it has been recommended by the Cardinal Newman Society in The Newman Guide to Choosing a Catholic College. It was described as one of the 25 most underrated colleges in the United States.

Research centers and facilities

According to the National Science Foundation, CUA spent $25.5 million on research and development in 2018.

Over time, several national Catholic scholarly associations became based at the university, including the Catholic Biblical Association of America, publisher of the Catholic Biblical Quarterly, and (for many years) the American Catholic Philosophical Association. The university is also home to the Catholic University of America Press.

Research institutes located here include:
Center for Advanced Training in Cell and Molecular Biology
Center for Advancement of Catholic Education
Center for American Catholic Studies
Center for Catalan Studies
Center for Irish Studies
Center for Medieval and Byzantine Studies
Center for Pastoral Studies
Center for the Study of Culture and Values
Center for the Study of Early Christianity
Center for the Study of Energy and Environmental Stewardship
Center for Ward Method Studies
Homecare and Telerehabilitation Technology Center
Institute for Astrophysics and Computational Sciences
Institute for Biomolecular Studies
Institute for Christian Oriental Research
Institute for Communications Law Studies
Institute for Policy Research and Catholic Studies (formerly the Life Cycle Institute)
Institute for Sacred Music
Institute for Social Justice
Institute of Musical Arts
Latin American Center for Graduate Studies in Music
Vitreous State Laboratory

Libraries
The main library on campus is the John K. Mullen of Denver Memorial Library. The library system houses more than 1.3 million books and print volumes and provides access to tens of thousands of electronic journals and books. The University is also a partner in the Washington Research Library Consortium. The special collections of the university support advanced research and preserve University records, manuscript collections, and audiovisual materials which document the history of Catholics in America and the history of Catholic University. Rare books collections contain materials ranging from medieval manuscripts to modern first editions. The Semitics/Institute of Christian Oriental Research (ICOR) library supports research on the languages of the Bible and the ancient Near East. A special autonomous library, the Oliveira Lima Library (sometimes referred to as the Ibero-American Library), houses one of the largest collections of rare books on history and literature of Portuguese Brazilian culture outside of Brazil.

Pima Community College
In 2019, a partnership with Pima Community College was announced whereby students could earn an associate degree from Pima and a bachelor's degree in business management from Catholic University.

Over the course of the program, two-thirds of courses will be taken remotely and one-third will be taken on the Pima campus. Some local business leaders will serve as adjunct professors.

Between 20 and 25 students will initially be admitted to the program, which has a total four year cost of $32,000.

Catholic University officials recognized that most Hispanics in the United States are Catholics but historically have not had access to Catholic higher education in their areas. According to a university press release, an analysis by Catholic University found that of "the 25 U.S. cities with the largest total increases in the Hispanic population, nine have no Catholic college or university in close proximity." Given this, in 2017, Catholic University began exploring partnerships with existing institutions in the Southwest. Several cities with large populations of Hispanics and Catholics were considered when then-Tucson Mayor Jonathan Rothschild heard of Catholic University's desire to open a satellite campus. He called the university's provost and then connected the provost with the bishop.

Academic freedom
The university continues to be under censure by the American Association of University Professors for academic freedom violations and continues to ban certain speakers from campus.

Dismissal of Professor Charles Curran
In 1967, a tenured professor of theology Reverend Charles E. Curran was fired for his views on birth control but was reinstated after a five-day faculty-led strike. In 1986, the Vatican declared that Curran could no longer teach theology at Catholic University after the Curia department in charge of promulgating Catholic doctrine, headed by Josef Ratzinger, decided he was unfit. The areas of dispute included publishing articles that debated theological and ethical views regarding divorce, artificial contraception, masturbation, pre-marital intercourse, and homosexual acts.

As noted in the American Association of University Professors report, "Had it not been for the intervention of the Sacred Congregation for the Doctrine of the Faith, Professor Curran would undoubtedly still be active in the university's Department of Theology, a popular teacher, honored theologian, and respected colleague." Curran's attorneys argued that CUA did not follow proper procedures or its policy statements in handling the case. In response, CUA claimed that the Vatican's actions against Curran trumped any campus-based policy or tenure rules. In 1989, Curran filed suit against Catholic University, claiming unlawfully termination. Curran's case was ultimately dismissed; the court found Catholic University had the right to fire Curran for teaching theology from a viewpoint that contradicted to the school's religion.

In 1990, the American Association of University Professors (AAUP) defended Curran and censured Catholic University's administration for failing to adhere to the AAUP's Principles on Academic Freedom and Tenure. The AAUP found that "unsatisfactory conditions of academic freedom and tenure have been found to prevail" at The Catholic University of America. , the administration of Catholic University remains on the list of censured institutions. AAUP censure is a purely symbolic designation that does not effect an institution's accreditation or the standing of AAUP members and prospective members on the faculty at a school whose administration remains under censure.

The administration of Catholic University has consistently reached out to the AAUP to explore lifting the censure. The two conditions for having the censure removed are inviting Curran, whose license to teach Catholic theology had been suspended by the Vatican, back to campus and changing the university's "Statement on Academic Freedom". President David M. O'Connell refused to do either, stating, "Every American university has a right to govern itself according to its own identity, mission, standards, and procedures." The Vatican's decision regarding Curran's qualifications to teach Catholic theology was made unilaterally and is unlikely to change unless Curran's stances come into compliance with church teachings. The Catholic University of America's bylaws require the school to comply with relevant Vatican policies and designates that the Archbishop of Washington D.C., who is chosen by the Vatican, is ex officio the school's chancellor. This system makes it extremely unlikely Catholic University will amend the school's charter and come into compliance with the current conditions expressed by the AAUP for lifting their censure of the school's administration.

Speaker policy
The university as a policy does not allow outside guests to speak on campus to any audience if they have previously expressed an opinion on abortion or other serious issues conflicting with the Catholic Church's teaching. Applying this policy in 2004, CUA was criticized for rescinding Stanley Tucci's invitation for a seminar about Italian cinema, because he had lent past support for Planned Parenthood.

The next year, in 2005, the school was criticized for initially rejecting an application for recognition of a student chapter of the NAACP; one of the reasons officials cited in its rejection was the national organization's pro-choice stance. In 2006 the CUA administration barred a student-run on-campus performance of Eve Ensler's The Vagina Monologues.

In 2009, the school made its speaker policy more stringent, prohibiting all candidates for political office from speaking on campus. Representatives of both Democratic and Republican clubs on campus have criticized the decision.

Demographics
The student population in 2019 was 5,059. Approximately 91% of undergraduates receive some form of financial aid. There are slightly more female students at 53%, and a 1:7 faculty to student ratio. 83.8% of full-time faculty have a terminal degree.

Student life

There are over 100 registered student clubs and organizations at CUA for a wide variety of interests including athletics, academics, social, Greek life, service, political and religious.

Annual events include week-long Homecoming celebrations, the Mr. CUA competition, and several dances including the Beaux Arts Ball, the Mistletoe Ball, and the Athletes Ball. In addition to radio station WCUA, other campus media outlets include The Crosier, a scholarly publication concerning Catholic social teaching, The Tower, the campus' independent weekly newspaper, and CRUX, a literary magazine.

Although Catholic University states that it does not have any Greek life on campus, it has three Greek social organizations and one Greek service organization. Catholic University Greek life includes Alpha Delta Gamma the national Catholic social fraternity–Kappa chapter and Kappa Tau Gamma the local Christian social-service sorority. Although not officially recognized by the university, the Sigma-Psi chapter of the Kappa Sigma fraternity received an official charter in 2014. The members are all students of the university and are active on and around the campus. The national service fraternity, Alpha Phi Omega, has a chapter (Zeta Mu) on campus as well. Former Phi Kappa Theta DC Omega chapter is inactive.

The CUA Student Association is the university's undergraduate student government. It includes the General Assembly, an advocacy body, and the Student Fee Allocation Board which serves as the steward of the Student Activity and Club Sports Fee. The graduate student government is a separate entity and was not affected by the changes during the 2006–2007 academic year.

Music and drama
The music and drama programs, as part of a class, stage productions each semester, performances ranging from Broadway productions to plays and operas. Catholic University students also participate in a Symphony orchestra and choral groups, including a cappella groups Take Note, RedLine, and the Washingtones.

There have been several songs associated with the university over the years. The most recent fight song, written by Steve Schatz, was adopted in 2002. The original fight song, "The Flying Cardinals", dates back to before the 1930s. There are two alma maters, considered to be the university's official songs. The first, "Hail CUA" was set to music composed by Victor Herbert and was adopted in 1920. The other, Guardians of Truth by Fr. Thomas McLean, actually came in 2nd place in the 1920 competition but was widely adopted in the ensuing years.

Albert Von Tilzer, composer of Take Me Out to the Ball Game, wrote two songs for the university, We're Rooting For You and CU Will Shine Tonight. The earliest sports song, Through the Town, dates from 1916. Drink a Highball was a popular song during Prohibition. In honor of the university's 125th anniversary, an hour-long nostalgic musical revue was performed.

Campus ministry and religious life
84% of undergraduates and 59% of graduate students self-identify as Catholic. The campus ministry has two groups of student ministers: the "resident ministers" who live in residence halls and focus primarily on upperclassmen and the "house members", who focus on freshmen.

The Friday Night Planning Committee works with the house members to plan activities for Friday nights that are alcohol-free. Campus ministry also coordinates university liturgies, plans and runs retreats, and operates the online Prayernet.

Athletics

Catholic (CUA) athletic teams are called the Cardinals. The university is a member of the Division III of the National Collegiate Athletic Association (NCAA), primarily competing in the Landmark Conference for most of its sports since the 2007–08 academic year. They are also associate members of the New England Women's and Men's Athletic Conference for football, and the Mid-Atlantic Rowing Conference for rowing. The team colors are red (PMS 1805) and black. The first recorded football game was played against Mount Saint Mary's College on November 28, 1895, but records indicate earlier track and field events.

The university beat the University of Mississippi at the second Orange Bowl in 1936, 20–19. They also tied the Arizona State Teachers College at Tempe (now Arizona State University) in the 1940 Sun Bowl. The basketball Cardinals played in the 1944 NCAA basketball tournament, finishing as the Eastern Fourth Place team in the eight-team era of the tournament. They lost to runner-up Dartmouth College 63-38 in the regional semifinals, and Temple University 55-35 in the regional consolation game. 

CUA competes in 25 NCAA Division III intercollegiate varsity sports: Men's sports include baseball, basketball, cross country, football, golf, lacrosse, rowing, soccer, swimming & diving, tennis and track & field (indoor and outdoor); while women's sports include basketball, cross country, field hockey, golf, lacrosse, rowing, soccer, softball, swimming & diving, tennis, track & field (indoor and outdoor) and volleyball.

Non-varsity sports
Students field club teams in sports including cheerleading, ice hockey, rugby, sailing and lacrosse.

The ice hockey team competes in the Delaware Valley Collegiate Hockey Conference (DVCHC) of the ACHA and plays at the Fort Dupont Ice Arena in Washington, D.C. The team won the Mason-Dixon Collegiate Hockey Association (MDCHA) Championship in 2009, the Blue Ridge Hockey Conference (BRHC) Championship in 2015, and the DVCHC Patriot Division Championship in 2019.
The men's club lacrosse team competes in Division 2 of the Chesapeake Conference in the National College Lacrosse League. The team has secured the NCLL Division 2 National Championship for 2015, 2016, and 2017.
The men's rugby team competes in the Potomac Rugby Conference of the NSCRO.
The women's rugby team competes in the Capital Rugby Union of the NSCRO.
The sailing team competes in the Middle Atlantic Intercollegiate Sailing Association of the ICSA.

Notable alumni and faculty

There are many notable alumni of The Catholic University of America, particularly in the arts, in the Catholic Church and in public service. Graduates include cardinals, bishops, priests, and nuns. CUA's current total of alumni exceeds 83,000, including 12 living cardinals.

In 1942, Catholic University became the first university to award a doctorate in geology to an African American, Marguerite Williams.

University rectors and presidents
 Bishop John J. Keane (1887–1896)
 Bishop Thomas J. Conaty (1896–1903)
 Bishop Denis J. O'Connell (1903–1909)
 Bishop Thomas J. Shahan (1909–1927)
 Bishop James Hugh Ryan (1928–1935)
 Bishop Joseph M. Corrigan (1936–1942)
 Bishop Patrick J. McCormick (1943–1953)
 Bishop Bryan J. McEntegart (1953–1957)
 Bishop William J. McDonald (1957–1967, last Rector)
 Clarence C. Walton (1969–1978, first President)
 Edmund D. Pellegrino (1978–1982)
 William J. Byron (1982–1992)
 Patrick Ellis (1992–1998)
 Bishop David M. O'Connell (1998–2010)
 John H. Garvey (2010–2022)
 Peter Kilpatrick (2022–present)

Board of trustees

CUA was founded by the nation's bishops, and they continue to have a presence on the board of trustees. There are 48 elected members, and the bylaws stipulate that 24 must be clerics, 18 of which must be members of the bishops' conference. Of the 51 total trustees (including the university president), 24 are bishops (including seven cardinals). In addition, there are one religious sister and two priests.

References

External links

Official athletics website

 
1887 establishments in Washington, D.C.
Association of Catholic Colleges and Universities
Catholic Church in Washington, D.C.
Catholic universities and colleges in Washington, D.C.
Educational institutions established in 1887
Pontifical universities
Pope Leo XIII
Private universities and colleges in Washington, D.C.